The 2016 Southern Conference men's basketball tournament took place Friday, March 4 through Monday, March 7 in Asheville, North Carolina, at the U.S. Cellular Center. The entire tournament was streamed on ESPN3, with the Southern Conference Championship Game televised on ESPN2 at 9pm EST. The champion, Chattanooga, received an automatic bid into the 2016 NCAA tournament.

Seeds

Bracket

All-tournament team

First Team
T.J. Cromer, ETSU
Ge’Lawn Guyn, ETSU
Tre’ McLean, Chattanooga
Greg Pryor, Chattanooga
Mike Brown, Western Carolina

Second Team
Desonta Bradford, ETSU
Devin Sibley, Furman
QJ Peterson, VMI
Torrion Brummitt, Western Carolina
Fletcher Magee, Wofford

References

Tournament
Basketball competitions in Asheville, North Carolina
College sports tournaments in North Carolina
College basketball in North Carolina
Southern Conference men's basketball tournament
Southern Conference men's basketball tournament
Southern Conference men's basketball tournament